The Xiaolin Village Memorial Park is a memorial park in Siaolin Village, Jiasian District, Kaohsiung, Taiwan. The park commemorates victims of the Typhoon Morakot in 2009.

History
In the aftermath of Typhoon Morakot, Magistrate Yang Chiu-hsing proposed the establishment of a memorial park to commemorate the victims buried in landslide cause by the typhoon. The memorial park was officiated on 15 January 2012 during a ceremony attended by President Ma Ying-jeou, Mayor Chen Chu and Lin Join-sane.

Architecture
The memorial park measures 1.7 hectares in area and includes an ancestral hall, bridge, memorial square, monument and viewing platform. There are 181 mountain cherry trees planted at the park, representing 181 families who were lost during the natural disaster. It features a 9-meter monument which was made from stones felt down during the landslide.

See also
 List of tourist attractions in Taiwan

References

2012 establishments in Taiwan
Buildings and structures completed in 2012
Buildings and structures in Kaohsiung
Memorial parks in Taiwan
Tourist attractions in Kaohsiung